HHP may refer to:

 East Carolina University College of Health and Human Performance
 Hand Held Products, a manufacturer of linear and 2D handheld barcode scanners
 Helping Hand Party, a political party in British Columbia, Canada
 Henry Hudson Parkway, a parkway in New York City.
 High hydrostatic pressure processing, of food
 Hilton Head Preparatory School, in South Carolina, United States
 Hip Hop Pantsula (born 1980), South African hip-hop artist
 Philippine Air Force
 Shun Tak Heliport, in Hong Kong
 University of Florida College of Health and Human Performance